Driss Lachgar (born 1954, Rabat) is a Moroccan politician of the Socialist Union of Popular Forces (USFP) party. Between 2010 and 2012, he held the position of Minister of Relations with the Parliament in the cabinet of Abbas El Fassi.

On 21 May 2017, Lachgar was re-elected for a second term as First Secretary of the USFP at the party's 10th congress. There was no opposing candidate, and he received 86.85% of the vote.

See also
Cabinet of Morocco

References

External links
Personal blog

Living people
Government ministers of Morocco
1954 births
People from Rabat
20th-century Moroccan lawyers
Mohammed V University alumni
Socialist Union of Popular Forces politicians